Citizens United v. Federal Election Commission, 558 U.S. 310 (2010), was a landmark decision of the Supreme Court of the United States regarding campaign finance laws and free speech under the First Amendment to the U.S. Constitution. It was argued in 2009 and decided in 2010. The court held 5-4 that the free speech clause of the First Amendment prohibits the government from restricting independent expenditures for political campaigns by corporations, including nonprofit corporations, labor unions, and other associations.

The case began after Citizens United, a conservative non-profit organization, sought to air and advertise a film critical of  then Democratic presidential candidate Hillary Clinton shortly before the 2008 Democratic primary elections. Broadcasting the film would have been a violation of the 2002 Bipartisan Campaign Reform Act, which prohibited any corporation, non-profit organization, or labor union from making an "electioneering communication" within 30 days of a primary or 60 days of an election, or making any expenditure advocating the election or defeat of a candidate at any time. Citizens United challenged the constitutionality of this law, and its case reached the Supreme Court.

In a majority opinion joined by four other justices, Associate Justice Anthony Kennedy held that the Bipartisan Campaign Reform Act's prohibition of all independent expenditures by corporations and unions violated the First Amendment's protection of free speech. The court overruled Austin v. Michigan Chamber of Commerce (1990), which had allowed a prohibition on election spending by incorporated entities, as well as a portion of McConnell v. FEC (2003) that had upheld restricted corporate spending on "electioneering communications." The ruling effectively freed corporations (including incorporated non-profit organizations) to spend money on electioneering communications and to directly advocate for the election or defeat of candidates. In a dissenting opinion, Associate Justice John Paul Stevens argued that the court's ruling represented "a rejection of the common sense of the American people, who have recognized a need to prevent corporations from undermining self government."

The decision remains highly controversial, generating much public discussion and receiving strong support and opposition from various groups. Senator Mitch McConnell commended the decision, arguing that it represented "an important step in the direction of restoring the First Amendment rights". By contrast, former President Barack Obama stated that the decision "gives the special interests and their lobbyists even more power in Washington". The ruling represented a turning point on campaign finance, allowing unlimited election spending by corporations and labor unions, and setting the stage for Speechnow.org v. FEC, which authorized the creation of "Independent Expenditure Committees", more commonly known as Super PACs, and for later rulings by the Roberts Court, including McCutcheon v. FEC (2014), striking down other campaign finance restrictions. While the long-term legacy of this case remains to be seen, early studies by political scientists have concluded that Citizens United worked in favor of the electoral success of Republican candidates.

Case summary 

In the case,
the incorporated non-profit organization Citizens United wanted to air a film that was critical of Hillary Clinton and to advertise the film during television broadcasts, in violation of the 2002 Bipartisan Campaign Reform Act, commonly known as the McCain–Feingold Act or "BCRA" (pronounced "bik-ruh"), which prohibited "electioneering communications" by incorporated entities. Section 203 of BCRA defined an "electioneering communication" as a broadcast, cable, or satellite communication that mentioned a candidate within 60 days of a general election or 30 days of a primary, and prohibited such expenditures by corporations and unions. The United States District Court for the District of Columbia held that §203 of BCRA applied and prohibited Citizens United from paying to have the film Hillary: The Movie shown on television within 30 days of the 2008 Democratic primaries; however, Citizens United would be able to broadcast the advertisements for the film as they fell in the "safe harbor of the FEC's prohibition regulations implementing WRTL". The Supreme Court reversed this decision, striking down those provisions of BCRA that prohibited corporations (including nonprofit corporations) and unions from making independent expenditures for "electioneering communications". The majority decision overruled Austin v. Michigan Chamber of Commerce (1990) and partially overruled McConnell v. Federal Election Commission (2003).  The court, however, upheld requirements for public disclosure by sponsors of advertisements (BCRA §201 and §311). The case did not involve the federal ban on direct contributions from corporations or unions to candidate campaigns or political parties, which remain illegal in races for federal office.

Background 
Section 203 of the Bipartisan Campaign Reform Act of 2002 (known as BCRA or McCain–Feingold Act) modified the Federal Election Campaign Act of 1971,  to prohibit corporations and unions from using their general treasury to fund "electioneering communications" (broadcast advertisements mentioning a candidate in any context) within 30 days before a primary or 60 days before a general election. During the 2004 presidential campaign, Citizens United, a nonprofit 501(c)(4) organization, filed a complaint before the Federal Election Commission (FEC) charging that advertisements for Michael Moore's film Fahrenheit 9/11, a docudrama critical of the Bush administration's response to the terrorist attacks on September 11, 2001, produced and marketed by a variety of corporate entities, constituted political advertising and thus could not be aired within the 30 days before a primary election or 60 days before a general election. The FEC dismissed the complaint after finding no evidence that broadcast advertisements featuring a candidate within the proscribed time limits had actually been made. The FEC later dismissed a second complaint which argued that the movie itself constituted illegal corporate spending advocating the election or defeat of a candidate, which was illegal under the Taft–Hartley Act of 1947 and the Federal Election Campaign Act Amendments of 1974. In dismissing that complaint, the FEC found that:

In response, Citizens United produced the documentary Celsius 41.11, which is highly critical of both Fahrenheit 9/11 and 2004 Democratic presidential nominee John Kerry. The FEC, however, held that showing the movie and advertisements for it would violate the Federal Election Campaign Act, because Citizens United was not a bona fide commercial film maker.

In the wake of these decisions, Citizens United sought to establish itself as a bona fide commercial film maker before the 2008 elections, producing several documentary films between 2005 and 2007. By early 2008, it sought to run three television advertisements to promote its political documentary Hillary: The Movie and to air the movie on DirecTV.

In the District Court
In December 2007, Citizens United filed a complaint in U.S. District Court for the District of Columbia challenging the constitutionality of several statutory provisions governing "electioneering communications". It asked the court to declare that the prohibition on corporate and union funding were facially unconstitutional, and also as applied to Hillary: The Movie and to the 30-second advertisement for the movie, and to enjoin the Federal Election Commission from enforcing its regulations. Citizens United also argued that the Commission's disclosure and disclaimer requirements were unconstitutional as applied to the movie pursuant to the Supreme Court decision in Federal Election Commission v. Wisconsin Right to Life, Inc..  It also sought to enjoin funding, disclosure and disclaimer requirements as applied to Citizens United's intended ads for the movie.

In accordance with special rules in section 403 of the BCRA, a three-judge panel was convened to hear the case. On January 15, 2008, the court denied Citizens United's motion for a preliminary injunction, finding that the suit had little chance of success because the movie had no reasonable interpretation other than as an appeal to vote against Senator Clinton, that it was therefore express advocacy, not entitled to exemption from the ban on corporate funding of electioneering communications. The court held that the Supreme Court in McConnell v. FEC (2003) had found the disclosure requirements constitutional as to all electioneering communications, and Wisconsin RTL did not disturb this holding because the only issue of that case was whether speech that did not constitute the functional equivalent of express advocacy could be banned during the relevant pre-election period. However, Citizens United's complaint that § 203 of the BCRA violates the First Amendment as applied to the 30-second advertisement "Questions" was denied as moot, since "The FEC, in its filings and at oral argument, conceded that the advertisement is exempt from the Prohibition".

On July 18, 2008, the District Court granted summary judgment to the Federal Election Commission. In accordance with the special rules in BCRA, Citizens United appealed to the Supreme Court which docketed the case on August 18, 2008 and noted probable jurisdiction on November 14, 2008.

The Supreme Court heard oral argument on March 24, 2009 and then asked for further briefs on June 29; the re-argument was heard on September 9, 2009.

Arguments before the Supreme Court
During the original oral argument, Deputy Solicitor General Malcolm L. Stewart (representing the FEC) argued that under Austin v. Michigan Chamber of Commerce, the government would have the power to ban books if those books contained even one sentence expressly advocating the election or defeat of a candidate and were published or distributed by a corporation or labor union.  In response to this line of questioning, Stewart further argued that under Austin the government could ban the digital distribution of political books over the Amazon Kindle or prevent a union from hiring an author to write a political book.

According to a 2012 article in The New Yorker by Jeffrey Toobin, the court expected after oral argument to rule on the narrow question that had originally been presented—Can Citizens United show the film? At the subsequent conference among the justices after oral argument, the vote was 5–4 in favor of Citizens United being allowed to show the film. The justices voted the same as they had in Federal Election Commission v. Wisconsin Right to Life, Inc., a similar 2007 case, with Chief Justice Roberts and Justices Scalia, Kennedy, Thomas and Alito in the majority.

Chief Justice John Roberts wrote the initial opinion of the court, holding that BCRA allowed the showing of the film. A draft concurring opinion by Justice Kennedy argued that the court could and should have gone much further. The other justices in the majority agreed with Kennedy's reasoning, and convinced Roberts to reassign the writing and allow Kennedy's concurrence to become the majority opinion.

On the other side, John Paul Stevens, the most senior justice in the minority, assigned the dissent to David Souter, who announced his retirement from the court while he was working on it. The final draft went beyond critiquing the majority. Toobin described it as "air[ing] some of the Court's dirty laundry", writing that Souter's dissent accused Roberts of having manipulated court procedures to reach his desired result—an expansive decision that, Souter claimed, changed decades of election law and ruled on issues neither party to the litigation had presented.

According to Toobin, Roberts agreed to withdraw the opinion and schedule the case for reargument. When he did, the "Questions Presented" to the parties were, however, more expansive, touching on the issues Kennedy's opinion had identified. According to Toobin, the eventual result was therefore a foregone conclusion from that point on. Toobin's account has been criticized for drawing conclusions unsupported by the evidence in his article.

On June 29, 2009, the last day of the term, the court issued an order directing the parties to re-argue the case on September 9 after briefing whether it might be necessary to overrule Austin and/or McConnell v. Federal Election Commission to decide the case. Justice Stevens noted in his dissent that in its prior motion for summary judgment, Citizens United had abandoned its facial challenge of BCRA §203's constitutionality, with the parties agreeing to the dismissal of the claim.

Justice Sotomayor sat on the bench for the first time during the second round of oral arguments. This was the first case argued by then-Solicitor General and future Supreme Court Justice Elena Kagan. Former Bush Solicitor General Ted Olson and First Amendment lawyer Floyd Abrams argued for Citizens United, and former Clinton Solicitor General Seth Waxman defended the statute on behalf of various supporters. Legal scholar Erwin Chemerinsky called it "one of the most important First Amendment cases in years".

Decision 
On January 21, 2010, the court issued a 5–4 decision in favor of Citizens United that struck down BCRA's restrictions on independent expenditures from corporate treasuries as violations of the First Amendment.

Opinion of the court

Five justices formed the majority and joined an opinion written by Justice Anthony Kennedy. The court found that BCRA §203 prohibition of all independent expenditures by corporations and unions violated the First Amendment's protection of free speech. The majority wrote, "If the First Amendment has any force, it prohibits Congress from fining or jailing citizens, or associations of citizens, for simply engaging in political speech."

Justice Kennedy's opinion also noted that because the First Amendment does not distinguish between media and other corporations, the BCRA restrictions improperly allowed Congress to suppress political speech in newspapers, books, television, and blogs. The court overruled Austin, which had held that a state law that prohibited corporations from using treasury money to support or oppose candidates in elections did not violate the First and Fourteenth Amendments. The court also overruled that portion of McConnell that upheld BCRA's restriction of corporate spending on "electioneering communications". The court's ruling effectively freed corporations and unions to spend money both on "electioneering communications" and to directly advocate for the election or defeat of candidates (although not to contribute directly to candidates or political parties).

The majority ruled that the Freedom of the Press clause of the First Amendment protects associations of individuals in addition to individual speakers, and further that the First Amendment does not allow prohibitions of speech based on the identity of the speaker. Corporations, as associations of individuals, therefore have free speech rights under the First Amendment. Because spending money is essential to disseminating speech, as established in Buckley v. Valeo, limiting a corporation's ability to spend money is unconstitutional, because it limits the ability of its members to associate effectively and to speak on political issues.

The decision overruled Austin both because that decision allowed an absolute prohibition on corporate electoral spending, and because it permitted different restrictions on speech-related spending based on corporate identity.  Most importantly, the decision said that Austin was based on an "equality" rationale—trying to equalize speech between different speakers—that the court had previously rejected as illegitimate under the First Amendment in Buckley. The Michigan statute at issue in Austin had distinguished between corporate and union spending, prohibiting the former while allowing the latter. The Austin court, over the dissent by Justices Scalia, Kennedy, and O'Connor, had held that such distinctions were within the legislature's prerogative. In Citizens United v. Federal Election Commission, however, the majority argued that the First Amendment purposefully keeps the government from interfering in the "marketplace of ideas" and "rationing" speech, and it is not up to the legislatures or the courts to create a sense of "fairness" by restricting speech.

The majority also criticized Austin's reasoning that the "distorting effect" of large corporate expenditures constituted a risk of corruption or the appearance of corruption. Rather, the majority argued that the government had no place in determining whether large expenditures distorted an audience's perceptions, and that the type of "corruption" that might justify government controls on spending for speech had to relate to some form of "quid pro quo" transaction: "There is no such thing as too much speech."  The public has a right to have access to all information and to determine the reliability and importance of the information. Additionally, the majority did not believe that reliable evidence substantiated the risk of corruption or the appearance of corruption, and so this rationale did not satisfy strict scrutiny.

The court's opinion relied heavily on the reasoning and principles of the landmark campaign finance case of Buckley and First National Bank of Boston v. Bellotti, in which the court struck down a broad prohibition against independent expenditures by corporations in ballot initiatives and referendums. Specifically, the court echoed Bellotti's rejection of categories based on a corporation's purpose.  The majority argued that to grant Freedom of the Press protections to media corporations, but not others, presented a host of problems; and so all corporations should be equally protected from expenditure restrictions.

The court found that BCRA §§201 and 311, provisions requiring disclosure of the funder, were valid as applied to the movie advertisements and to the movie itself. The majority ruled for the disclosure of the sources of campaign contributions, saying thatprompt disclosure of expenditures can provide shareholders and citizens with the information needed to hold corporations and elected officials accountable for their positions and supporters. Shareholders can determine whether their corporation's political speech advances the corporation's interest in making profits, and citizens can see whether elected officials are "in the pocket" of so-called moneyed interests ... This transparency enables the electorate to make informed decisions and give proper weight to different speakers and messages.

Concurrences 
Chief Justice Roberts, with whom Justice Alito joined, wrote separately "to address the important principles of judicial restraint and stare decisis implicated in this case".

Roberts wrote to further explain and defend the court's statement that "there is a difference between judicial restraint and judicial abdication."  Roberts explained why the court must sometimes overrule prior decisions. Had prior courts never gone against stare decisis (that is, against precedent), for example, "segregation would be legal, minimum wage laws would be unconstitutional, and the Government could wiretap ordinary criminal suspects without first obtaining warrants".  Roberts's concurrence recited a plethora of case law in which the court had ruled against precedent.  Ultimately, Roberts argued that "stare decisis ... counsels deference to past mistakes, but provides no justification for making new ones".

Justice Scalia joined the opinion of the court, and wrote a concurring opinion which Justice Alito joined in full and Justice Thomas joined in part. Scalia addressed Justice Stevens' dissent, specifically with regard to the original understanding of the First Amendment. Scalia wrote that Stevens's dissent was "in splendid isolation from the text of the First Amendment ... It never shows why 'the freedom of speech' that was the right of Englishmen did not include the freedom to speak in association with other individuals, including association in the corporate form."  He further considered the dissent's exploration of the Framers' views about the "role of corporations in society" to be misleading, and even if valid, irrelevant to the text. Scalia principally argued that the First Amendment was written in "terms of speech, not speakers" and that "Its text offers no foothold for excluding any category of speaker."  Scalia argued that the Free Press clause was originally intended to protect the distribution of written materials and did not only apply to the media specifically.  This understanding supported the majority's contention that the Constitution does not allow the court to separate corporations into media and non-media categories.

Justice Thomas wrote a separate opinion concurring in all but the upholding of the disclosure provisions. In order to protect the anonymity of contributors to organizations exercising free speech, Thomas would have struck down the reporting requirements of BCRA §201 and §311 as well, rather than allowing them to be challenged only on a case-specific basis. Thomas's primary argument was that anonymous free speech is protected and that making contributor lists public makes the contributors vulnerable to retaliation, citing instances of retaliation against contributors to both sides of a then-recent California voter initiative. Thomas also expressed concern that such retaliation could extend to retaliation by elected officials. Thomas did not consider "as-applied challenges" to be sufficient to protect against the threat of retaliation.

Dissent 

A dissenting opinion by Justice Stevens was joined by Justice Ginsburg, Justice Breyer, and Justice Sotomayor. To emphasize his unhappiness with the majority, Stevens read part of his 90-page dissent from the bench. Stevens concurred in the court's decision to sustain BCRA's disclosure provisions but dissented from the principal holding of the court. He argued that the court's ruling "threatens to undermine the integrity of elected institutions across the Nation. The path it has taken to reach its outcome will, I fear, do damage to this institution." He added: "A democracy cannot function effectively when its constituent members believe laws are being bought and sold."

Stevens also argued that the court addressed a question not raised by the litigants when it found BCRA §203 to be facially unconstitutional, and that the majority "changed the case to give themselves an opportunity to change the law". He argued that the majority had expanded the scope beyond the questions presented by the appellant and that therefore a sufficient record for judging the case did not exist. Stevens argued that at a minimum the court should have remanded the case for a fact-finding hearing, and that the majority did not consider other compilations of data, such as the Congressional record for justifying BCRA §203.

Corruption concerns
Stevens argued that the court had long recognized that to deny Congress the power to safeguard against "the improper use of money to influence the result [of an election] is to deny to the nation in a vital particular the power of self protection".  After recognizing that in Buckley v. Valeo the court had struck down portions of a broad prohibition of independent expenditures from any sources, Stevens argued that nevertheless Buckley recognized the legitimacy of "prophylactic" measures for limiting campaign spending and found the prevention of "corruption" to be a reasonable goal for legislation.  Consequently, Stevens argued that Buckley left the door open for carefully tailored future regulation.  Although the majority echoed many of the arguments in First National Bank of Boston v. Bellotti, Stevens argued that the majority opinion contradicted the reasoning of other campaign finance cases—in particular, of course, the two cases the majority expressly overruled, Austin v. Michigan State Chamber of Commerce and McConnell v. Federal Election Commission.

Stevens argued that the majority failed to recognize the possibility for corruption outside strict quid pro quo exchanges.  He referenced the record from "McConnell v. FEC" to argue that, even if the exchange of votes for expenditures could not be shown, contributors gain favorable political access from such expenditures. The majority, however, considered mere access to be an insufficient justification for limiting speech rights.

Stevens responded that in the past, even when striking down a ban on corporate independent expenditures, the court "never suggested that such quid pro quo debts must take the form of outright vote buying or bribes" (Bellotti). Buckley, he said, also acknowledged that large independent expenditures present the same dangers as quid pro quo arrangements, even though Buckley struck down limits on such independent expenditures. Using the record from "McConnell", he argued that independent expenditures were sometimes a factor in gaining political access and concluded that large independent expenditures generate more influence than direct campaign contributions.  Furthermore, Stevens argued that corporations could threaten Representatives and Senators with negative advertising to gain unprecedented leverage, citing Caperton v. A.T. Massey Coal Co., (holding that $3 million in independent expenditures in a judicial race raised sufficient questions about a judge's impartiality to require the judge to recuse himself in a future case involving the spender). Stevens argued that it was contradictory for the majority to ignore the same risks in legislative and executive elections, and argued that the majority opinion would exacerbate the problem presented in Caperton because of the number of states with judicial elections and increased spending in judicial races.

The appearance of corruption
Second, Stevens argued that the majority did not place enough emphasis on the need to prevent the "appearance of corruption" in elections.  Earlier cases, including Buckley, recognized the importance of public confidence in democracy.  Stevens cited recent data indicating that 80% of the public view corporate independent expenditures as a method used to gain unfair legislative access.  Stevens predicted that if the public came to believe that corporations dominate elections, disaffected voters would stop participating.

Corporations as part of the political process
Third, Stevens argued that the majority's decision failed to recognize the dangers of the corporate form. Austin held that the prevention of corruption, including the distorting influence of a dominant funding source, was a sufficient reason for regulating corporate independent expenditures. In defending Austin, Stevens argued that the unique qualities of corporations and other artificial legal entities made them dangerous to democratic elections. These legal entities, he argued, have perpetual life, the ability to amass large sums of money, limited liability, no ability to vote, no morality, no purpose outside profit-making, and no loyalty. Therefore, he argued, the courts should permit legislatures to regulate corporate participation in the political process.

Legal entities, Stevens wrote, are not "We the People" for whom our Constitution was established. Therefore, he argued, they should not be given speech protections under the First Amendment. The First Amendment, he argued, protects individual self-expression, self-realization and the communication of ideas. Corporate spending is the "furthest from the core of political expression" protected by the Constitution, he argued, citing Federal Election Commission v. Beaumont, and corporate spending on politics should be viewed as a business transaction designed by the officers or the boards of directors for no purpose other than profit-making.  Stevens called corporate spending "more transactional than ideological".  Stevens also pointed out that any member of a corporation may spend personal money on promoting a campaign because BCRA only prohibited the use of general treasury money.

Freedom of speech concerns
Stevens critiqued the majority's main argument that prohibiting limits on spending protects free speech and allows the general public to receive all available information. Citing Austin, Stevens argued that corporations unfairly influence the electoral process with vast sums of money that few individuals can match.  This process, he argued, puts disproportionate focus on supporting this type of speech and gives the impression of widespread acclaim regardless of actual support.

Media censorship concerns
Fifth, Stevens criticized the majority's fear that the government could use BCRA §203 to censor the media. The focus placed on this hypothetical fear made no sense to him because it did not relate to the facts of this case—if the government actually attempted to apply BCRA §203 to the media (and assuming that Citizens United could not constitute media), the court could deal with the problem at that time. Stevens described the majority's supposed protection of the media as nothing more than posturing. According to him, it was the majority's new rule in this case, that prohibited a law from distinguishing between speakers or funding sources. This new rule would be the only reason why media corporations could not be exempted from BCRA §203.

Stevens recognized that "[t]he press plays a unique role not only in the text, history, and structure of the First Amendment but also in facilitating public discourse," and even grants that the majority "raised some interesting and difficult questions about Congress' authority to regulate electioneering by the press, and about how to define what constitutes the press." In response he argued (emphasis in original) "that [this question of regulating and defining the press] is not the case before us."  Stevens's opinion expresses his view that the institutional press can be distinguished from other persons and entities that are not the press while the majority opinion viewed "freedom of the press" as an activity, applicable to all citizens or groups of citizens seeking to publish views.  However, while Stevens has been interpreted as implying the press clause specifically protects the institutional press it isn't clear from his opinion.  In footnote 62 Stevens does argue that the free press clause demonstrates "that the drafters of the First Amendment did draw distinctions—explicit distinctions—between types of "speakers", or speech outlets or forms" but the disjunctive form of the sentence doesn't clearly entail that the distinction must have been between types of speakers rather than outlets or forms.

Losing faith in our democracy
Sixth, Stevens claimed that the majority failed to give proper deference to the legislature.  Stevens predicted that this ruling would restrict the ability of the states to experiment with different methods for decreasing corruption in elections.  According to Stevens, this ruling virtually ended those efforts, "declaring by fiat" that people will not "lose faith in our democracy". Stevens argued that the majority's view of a self-serving legislature, passing campaign-spending laws to gain an advantage in retaining a seat, coupled with "strict scrutiny" of laws, would make it difficult for any campaign finance regulation to be upheld in future cases.

Shareholders rights
Seventh, Stevens argued that the majority opinion ignored the rights of shareholders.  A series of cases protects individuals from legally compelled payment of union dues to support political speech.  Because shareholders invest money in corporations, Stevens argued that the law should likewise help to protect shareholders from funding speech that they oppose.  The majority, however, argued that ownership of corporate stock was voluntary and that unhappy shareholders could simply sell off their shares if they did not agree with the corporation's speech. Stevens also argued that  Political Action Committees (PACs), which allow individual members of a corporation to invest money in a separate fund, are an adequate substitute for general corporate speech and better protect shareholder rights. The majority, by contrast, argued that most corporations are too small and lack the resources and raw number of shareholders and management staff necessary to support the legal compliance, accounting and administrative costs of a PAC. In this dispute, the opposing views essentially discussed differing types of entities: Stevens focused his argument on large, publicly held corporations, while the majority, and particularly Justice Scalia's concurring opinion, placed an emphasis on small, closely held corporations and non-profits.

Stevens called the majority's faith in "corporate democracy" an unrealistic method for a shareholder to oppose political funding.  A derivative suit is slow, inefficient, risky and potentially expensive.  Likewise, shareholder meetings only happen a few times a year, not prior to every decision or transaction.  Rather, the officers and boards control the day-to-day spending, including political spending.  According to Stevens, the shareholders have few options, giving them "virtually nonexistent" recourse for opposing a corporation's political spending.  Furthermore, most shareholders use investment intermediaries, such as mutual funds or pensions, and by the time a shareholder may find out about a corporation's political spending and try to object, the damage is done and the shareholder has funded disfavored speech.

Subsequent developments 
The decision was highly controversial and remains a subject of widespread public discussion. There was a wide range of reactions to the case from politicians, academics, attorneys, advocacy groups and journalists.

Support

Politicians
Senate Minority Leader Mitch McConnell, a plaintiff in the earlier related decision McConnell v. FEC, said: 

Republican campaign consultant Ed Rollins opined that the decision adds transparency to the election process and will make it more competitive.

Advocacy groups
Citizens United, the group filing the lawsuit, said, "Today's U.S. Supreme Court decision allowing Citizens United to air its documentary films and advertisements is a tremendous victory, not only for Citizens United but for every American who desires to participate in the political process." During litigation, Citizens United had support from the United States Chamber of Commerce and the National Rifle Association.

Campaign finance attorney Cleta Mitchell, who had filed an amicus curiae brief on behalf of two advocacy organizations opposing the ban, wrote that "The Supreme Court has correctly eliminated a constitutionally flawed system that allowed media corporations (e.g., The Washington Post Co.) to freely disseminate their opinions about candidates using corporate treasury funds, while denying that constitutional privilege to Susie's Flower Shop Inc. ... The real victims of the corporate expenditure ban have been nonprofit advocacy organizations across the political spectrum."

Heritage Foundation fellow Hans A. von Spakovsky, a former Republican member of the Federal Election Commission, said "The Supreme Court has restored a part of the First Amendment that had been unfortunately stolen by Congress and a previously wrongly-decided ruling of the court."

Libertarian Cato Institute analysts John Samples and Ilya Shapiro wrote that restrictions on advertising were based on the idea "that corporations had so much money that their spending would create vast inequalities in speech that would undermine democracy". They continued, "To make campaign spending equal or nearly so, the government would have to force some people or groups to spend less than they wished. And equality of speech is inherently contrary to protecting speech from government restraint, which is ultimately the heart of American conceptions of free speech."

The American Civil Liberties Union filed an amicus brief that supported the decision, saying that "section 203 should now be struck down as facially unconstitutional", though membership was split over the implications of the ruling, and its board sent the issue to its special committee on campaign finance for further consideration. On March 27, 2012, the ACLU reaffirmed its stance in support of the Supreme Court's Citizens United ruling.

Academics and attorneys
Bradley A. Smith, professor of law at Capital University Law School, former chairman of the FEC, founder of the Institute for Free Speech, and a leading proponent of deregulation of campaign finance, wrote that the major opponents of political free speech are "incumbent politicians" who "are keen to maintain a chokehold on such speech". Empowering "small and midsize corporations—and every incorporated mom-and-pop falafel joint, local firefighters' union, and environmental group—to make its voice heard" frightens them. In response to statements by President Obama and others that the ruling would allow foreign entities to gain political influence through U.S. subsidiaries, Smith pointed out that the decision did not overturn the ban on political donations by foreign corporations and the prohibition on any involvement by foreign nationals in decisions regarding political spending by U.S. subsidiaries, which are covered by other parts of the law.

Campaign finance expert Jan Baran, a member of the Commission on Federal Ethics Law Reform, agreed with the decision, writing that "The history of campaign finance reform is the history of incumbent politicians seeking to muzzle speakers, any speakers, particularly those who might publicly criticize them and their legislation. It is a lot easier to legislate against unions, gun owners, 'fat cat' bankers, health insurance companies and any other industry or 'special interest' group when they can't talk back."  Baran further noted that in general conservatives and libertarians praised the ruling's preservation of the First Amendment and freedom of speech, but that liberals and campaign finance reformers criticized it as greatly expanding the role of corporate money in politics.

Attorney Kenneth Gross, former associate general counsel of the FEC, wrote that corporations relied more on the development of long-term relationships, political action committees and personal contributions, which were not affected by the decision. He held that while trade associations might seek to raise funds and support candidates, corporations which have "signed on to transparency agreements regarding political spending" may not be eager to give.

The New York Times asked seven academics to opine on how corporate money would reshape politics as a result of the court's decision. Three of the seven wrote that the effects would be minimal or positive: Christopher Cotton, a University of Miami School of Business assistant professor of economics, wrote that "There may be very little difference between seeing eight ads or seeing nine ads (compared to seeing one ad or two). And, voters recognize that richer candidates are not necessarily the better candidates, and in some cases, the benefit of running more ads is offset by the negative signal that spending a lot of money creates. Eugene Volokh, a professor of law at UCLA, stated that the "most influential actors in most political campaigns" are media corporations which "overtly editorialize for and against candidates, and also influence elections by choosing what to cover and how to cover it". Holding that corporations like Exxon would fear alienating voters by supporting candidates, the decision really meant that voters would hear "more messages from more sources". Joel Gora, a professor at Brooklyn Law School who had previously argued the case of Buckley v. Valeo on behalf of the American Civil Liberties Union, said that the decision represented "a great day for the First Amendment" writing that the court had "dismantled the First Amendment 'caste system' in election speech".

Journalists
The Editorial Board of the San Antonio Express-News criticized McCain–Feingold's exception for media corporations from the ban on corporate electioneering, writing that it "makes no sense" that the paper could make endorsements up until the day of the election but advocacy groups could not. "While the influence of money on the political process is troubling and sometimes corrupting, abridging political speech is the wrong way to counterbalance that influence."

Anthony Dick in National Review countered a number of arguments against the decision, asking rhetorically, "is there something uniquely harmful and/or unworthy of protection about political messages that come from corporations and unions, as opposed to, say, rich individuals, persuasive writers, or charismatic demagogues?" He noted that "a recent Gallup poll shows that a majority of the public actually agrees with the Court that corporations and unions should be treated just like individuals in terms of their political-expenditure rights". A Gallup poll taken in October 2009 and released soon after the decision showed 57 percent of those surveyed agreed that contributions to political candidates are a form of free speech and 55 percent agreed that the same rules should apply to individuals, corporations and unions. Sixty-four percent of Democrats and Republicans believed campaign donations are a form of free speech.

Chicago Tribune editorial board member Steve Chapman wrote "If corporate advocacy may be forbidden as it was under the law in question, it's not just Exxon Mobil and Citigroup that are rendered mute. Nonprofit corporations set up merely to advance goals shared by citizens, such as the American Civil Liberties Union and the National Rifle Association, also have to put a sock in it. So much for the First Amendment goal of fostering debate about public policy."

Opposition

Politicians
President Barack Obama stated that the decision "gives the special interests and their lobbyists even more power in Washington—while undermining the influence of average Americans who make small contributions to support their preferred candidates". Obama later elaborated in his weekly radio address saying, "this ruling strikes at our democracy itself" and "I can't think of anything more devastating to the public interest". On January 27, 2010, Obama further condemned the decision during the 2010 State of the Union Address, stating that, "Last week, the Supreme Court reversed a century of law to open the floodgates for special interests—including foreign corporations—to spend without limit in our elections. Well, I don't think American elections should be bankrolled by America's most powerful interests, or worse, by foreign entities." On television, the camera shifted to a shot of the SCOTUS judges in the front row directly in front of the President while he was making this statement, and Justice Samuel Alito was frowning, shaking his head side to side while mouthing the words "Not true".

Democratic Senator Russ Feingold, a lead sponsor of the 2002 Bipartisan Campaign Reform Act, stated "This decision was a terrible mistake. Presented with a relatively narrow legal issue, the Supreme Court chose to roll back laws that have limited the role of corporate money in federal elections since Teddy Roosevelt was president." Representative Alan Grayson, a Democrat, stated that it was "the worst Supreme Court decision since the Dred Scott case, and that the court had opened the door to political bribery and corruption in elections to come. Democratic congresswoman Donna Edwards, along with constitutional law professor and Maryland Democratic State Senator Jamie Raskin, have advocated petitions to reverse the decision by means of constitutional amendment. Rep. Leonard Boswell introduced legislation to amend the constitution. Senator John Kerry also called for an Amendment to overrule the decision. On December 8, 2011, Senator Bernie Sanders proposed the Saving American Democracy Amendment, which would reverse the court's ruling.

Republican Senator John McCain, co-crafter of the 2002 Bipartisan Campaign Reform Act and the party's 2008 presidential nominee, said "there's going to be, over time, a backlash ... when you see the amounts of union and corporate money that's going to go into political campaigns". McCain was "disappointed by the decision of the Supreme Court and the lifting of the limits on corporate and union contributions" but not surprised by the decision, saying that "It was clear that Justice Roberts, Alito and Scalia, by their very skeptical and even sarcastic comments, were very much opposed to BCRA." Republican Senator Olympia Snowe opined that "Today's decision was a serious disservice to our country."

Although federal law after Citizens United v. Federal Election Commission still prohibited corporate contributions to all political parties, Sanda Everette, co-chair of the Green Party, stated that "The ruling especially hurts the ability of parties that don't accept corporate contributions, like the Green Party, to compete." Another Green Party officer, Rich Whitney, stated "In a transparently political decision, a majority of the US Supreme Court overturned its own recent precedent and paid tribute to the giant corporate interests that already wield tremendous power over our political process and political speech."

Ralph Nader condemned the ruling, saying that "With this decision, corporations can now directly pour vast amounts of corporate money, through independent expenditures, into the electoral swamp already flooded with corporate campaign PAC contribution dollars." Writing for CounterPunch, he called for shareholder resolutions asking company directors to pledge not to use company money to favor or oppose electoral candidates.

Pat Choate, former Reform Party candidate for Vice President, stated, "The court has, in effect, legalized foreign governments and foreign corporations to participate in our electoral politics."

Senator Bernie Sanders, a contender in the 2016 Democratic Primary, has filed a constitutional amendment to overturn the Supreme Court's Decision. Further, both Sanders and Hillary Clinton said that, if they were elected, they would only have appointed Supreme Court Justices who were committed to the repeal of Citizens United. In September 2015, Sanders said that "the foundations of American Democracy are being undermined" and called for sweeping campaign finance reform. Sanders repeated such calls in the years since.

When asked about the April 2014 ruling, former President Jimmy Carter called the United States "an oligarchy with unlimited political bribery" in an interview with Thom Hartmann.

International
Ambassador Janez Lenarčič, speaking for the Organization for Security and Co-operation in Europe's Office for Democratic Institutions and Human Rights (which has overseen over 150 elections) said the ruling may adversely affect the organization's two commitments of "giving voters a genuine choice and giving candidates a fair chance" in that "it threatens to further marginalize candidates without strong financial backing or extensive personal resources, thereby in effect narrowing the political arena".

Academics and attorneys

The constitutional law scholar Laurence H. Tribe wrote that the decision "marks a major upheaval in First Amendment law and signals the end of whatever legitimate claim could otherwise have been made by the Roberts Court to an incremental and minimalist approach to constitutional adjudication, to a modest view of the judicial role vis-à-vis the political branches, or to a genuine concern with adherence to precedent" and pointed out, "Talking about a business corporation as merely another way that individuals might choose to organize their association with one another to pursue their common expressive aims is worse than unrealistic; it obscures the very real injustice and distortion entailed in the phenomenon of some people using other people's money to support candidates they have made no decision to support, or to oppose candidates they have made no decision to oppose."

Former Supreme Court Justice Sandra Day O'Connor, whose opinions had changed from dissenting in Austin v. Michigan State Chamber of Commerce to co-authoring (with Stevens) the majority opinion in McConnell v. Federal Election Commission twelve years later, criticized the decision only obliquely, but warned, "In invalidating some of the existing checks on campaign spending, the majority in Citizens United has signaled that the problem of campaign contributions in judicial elections might get considerably worse and quite soon."

Richard L. Hasen, professor of election law at Loyola Law School, argued that the ruling "is activist, it increases the dangers of corruption in our political system and it ignores the strong tradition of American political equality". He also described Justice Kennedy's "specter of blog censorship" as sounding more like "the rantings of a right-wing talk show host than the rational view of a justice with a sense of political realism".

Kathleen M. Sullivan, professor at Stanford Law School and Steven J. Andre, adjunct professor at Lincoln Law School, argued that two different visions of freedom of speech exist and clashed in the case.  An egalitarian vision skeptical of the power of large agglomerations of wealth to skew the political process conflicted with a libertarian vision skeptical of government being placed in the role of determining what speech people should or should not hear. Wayne Batchis, Professor at the University of Delaware, in contrast, argues that the Citizens United decision represents a misguided interpretation of the non-textual freedom of association.

The four other scholars of the seven writing in the aforementioned The New York Times article were critical. Richard L. Hasen, Distinguished Professor of election law at Loyola Law School argued differently from his Slate article above, concentrating on the "inherent risk of corruption that comes when someone spends independently to try to influence the outcome of judicial elections", since judges are less publicly accountable than elected officials. Heather K. Gerken, Professor of Law at Yale Law School wrote that "The court has done real damage to the cause of reform, but that damage mostly came earlier, with decisions that made less of a splash." Michael Waldman, director of the Brennan Center for Justice at N.Y.U. School of Law, opined that the decision "matches or exceeds Bush v. Gore in ideological or partisan overreaching by the court", explaining how "Exxon or any other firm could spend Bloomberg-level sums in any congressional district in the country against, say, any congressman who supports climate change legislation, or health care, etc." and Fred Wertheimer, founder and president of Democracy 21 considered that "Chief Justice Roberts has abandoned the illusory public commitments he made to 'judicial modesty' and 'respect for precedent' to cast the deciding vote for a radical decision that profoundly undermines our democracy", and that "Congress and presidents past have recognized this danger and signed numerous laws over the years to prevent this kind of corruption of our government."

In a Time magazine survey of over 50 law professors, Richard Delgado (University of Alabama), Cass Sunstein (Harvard), and Jenny Martinez (Stanford) all listed Citizens United as the "worst Supreme Court decision since 1960", with Sunstein noting that the decision is "undermining our system of democracy itself."

Journalists
The New York Times stated in an editorial, "The Supreme Court has handed lobbyists a new weapon. A lobbyist can now tell any elected official: if you vote wrong, my company, labor union or interest group will spend unlimited sums explicitly advertising against your re-election." Jonathan Alter called it the "most serious threat to American democracy in a generation". The Christian Science Monitor wrote that the court had declared "outright that corporate expenditures cannot corrupt elected officials, that influence over lawmakers is not corruption, and that appearance of influence will not undermine public faith in our democracy".

Business leaders

In 2012, Ben Cohen, the co-founder of Ben & Jerry's ice cream, founded Stamp Stampede, a sustained protest to demonstrate widespread support for a proposed constitutional amendment to overturn Citizens United. The campaign encourages people to rubber stamp messages such as "Not To Be Used for Bribing Politicians" on paper currency. In 2014, Cohen told Salon, "As long as the Supreme Court rules money is speech, corporations and the wealthy are using it by giving piles of it to politicians to pass or not pass laws that they want. Now, the rest of the people, [those] who don't have that money, can actually make their voice heard by using money to stamp a message out."

Media coverage

Political blogs
Most blogs avoided the theoretical aspects of the decision and focused on more personal and dramatic elements, including the Barack Obama–Samuel Alito face-off during the President's State of the Union address. There, President Obama argued that the decision "reversed a century of law" (the federal ban on corporate contributions dates back to the 1907 Tillman Act, and the ban on union and corporate expenditures dates from 1947) and that it would allow "foreign corporations to spend without limits in our elections", during which Justice Alito, in the audience, perceptibly mouthed the words "not true". This event received extensive comment from political bloggers, with a substantial amount of the coverage concentrated on whether or not foreign corporations would be able to make substantial political contributions in US elections. In the opinion, the court had specifically indicated it was not overturning the ban on foreign contributions.

Opinion polls

An ABC–The Washington Post poll conducted February 4–8, 2010, showed that 80% of those surveyed opposed (and 65% strongly opposed) the Citizens United ruling, which the poll described as saying "corporations and unions can spend as much money as they want to help political candidates win elections". Additionally, 72% supported "an effort by Congress to reinstate limits on corporate and union spending on election campaigns". The poll showed large majority support from Democrats, Republicans and independents.

A Gallup Poll conducted in October 2009, after oral argument, but released after the Supreme Court released its opinion, found that 57 percent of those surveyed "agreed that money given to political candidates is a form of free speech" and 55 percent agreed that the "same rules should apply to individuals, corporations and unions". In the same poll, however, respondents by 52% to 41% prioritized limits on campaign contributions over protecting rights to support campaigns and 76% thought the government should be able to place limits on corporation or union donations.

Separate polls commissioned by various conservative organizations, including the plaintiff Citizens United and the Institute for Free Speech, using different wording, found support for the decision. In particular, the Center for Competitive Politics poll found that 51% of respondents believed that Citizens United should have a right to air ads promoting Hillary: The Movie. The poll also found that only 22 percent had heard of the case.

Polling conducted by Ipsos in August 2017 found that 48% of Americans oppose the decision and 30% support it, with the remainder having no opinion. It also found that 57% percent of Americans favored "limits on the amount of money super PACs can raise and spend".

Further court rulings

SpeechNow v. FEC

SpeechNow is a nonprofit, unincorporated association organized as a section 527 entity under the U.S. Internal Revenue Code. The organization was formed by individuals who seek to pool their resources to make independent expenditures expressly advocating the election or defeat of federal candidates. SpeechNow planned to accept contributions only from individuals, not corporations or other sources prohibited under the Federal Election Campaign Act. On February 14, 2008, SpeechNow and several individual plaintiffs filed a complaint in the U.S. District Court for the District of Columbia challenging the constitutionality of the Federal Election Campaign Act provisions governing political committee registration, contribution limits and disclosure. The plaintiffs contended that the Act unconstitutionally restricts their association guaranteed under the First Amendment. By requiring registration as a political committee and limiting the monetary amount that an individual may contribute to a political committee, SpeechNow and the other plaintiffs asserted that the Act unconstitutionally restricted the individuals' freedom of speech by limiting the amount that an individual can contribute to SpeechNow and thus the amount the organization may spend. SpeechNow also argued that the reporting required of political committees is unconstitutionally burdensome.

On March 26, 2010, the U.S. Court of Appeals for the District of Columbia Circuit ruled in SpeechNow.org. v. FEC that the contribution limits of 2 U.S.C. §441a were unconstitutional as applied to individuals' contributions to SpeechNow. The court also ruled that the reporting requirements of 2 U.S.C. §§432, 433 and 434(a) and the organizational requirements of 2 U.S.C. §431(4) and §431(8) can be constitutionally applied to SpeechNow. A unanimous nine-judge panel of the United States Court of Appeals struck down the federal limits on contributions to federal political committees that make only independent expenditures and do not contribute to candidates or political parties. This type of "independent expenditure committee" is inherently non-corruptive, the court reasoned, and therefore contributions to such a committee can not be limited based on the government's interest in preventing political corruption. In light of the Supreme Court's decision in Citizens United v. FEC, in which the Supreme Court held that the government has no anti-corruption interest in limiting independent expenditures, the appeals court ruled that "contributions to groups that make only independent expenditures cannot corrupt or create the appearance of corruption." As a result, the court of appeals held that the government has no anti-corruption interest in limiting contributions to an independent group such as SpeechNow. Contribution limits as applied to SpeechNow "violate the First Amendment by preventing [individuals] from donating to SpeechNow in excess of the limits and by prohibiting SpeechNow from accepting donations in excess of the limits." The court noted that its holding does not affect direct contributions to candidates, but rather contributions to a group that makes only independent expenditures. The appeals court held that, while disclosure and reporting requirements do impose a burden on First Amendment interests, they "'impose no ceiling on campaign related activities'" and "'do not prevent anyone from speaking.'" Furthermore, the court held that the additional reporting requirements that the Commission would impose on SpeechNow if it were organized as a political committee are minimal, "given the relative simplicity with which SpeechNow intends to operate." Since SpeechNow already had a number of "planned contributions" from individuals, the court ruled that SpeechNow could not compare itself to "ad hoc groups that want to create themselves on the spur of the moment." Since the public has an interest in knowing who is speaking about a candidate and who is funding that speech, the court held that requiring such disclosure and organization as a political committee are sufficiently important governmental interests to justify the additional reporting and registration burdens on SpeechNow.

Public electoral financing

On June 27, 2011, ruling in the consolidated cases of Arizona Free Enterprise Club's Freedom Club PAC v. Bennett (No. 10-238) and McComish v. Bennett (No. 10-239), the Supreme Court deemed unconstitutional an Arizona law that provided extra taxpayer-funded support for office seekers who have been outspent by privately funded opponents or by independent political groups. A conservative 5–4 majority of justices said the law violated free speech, concluding the state was impermissibly trying to "level the playing field" through a public finance system. Arizona lawmakers had argued there was a compelling state interest in equalizing resources among competing candidates and interest groups. Opponents said the law violated free-speech rights of the privately financed candidates and their contributors, inhibiting fundraising and spending, discouraging participation in campaigns and limiting what voters hear about politics. Chief Justice John Roberts said in the court's majority opinion that the law substantially burdened political speech and was not sufficiently justified to survive First Amendment scrutiny.

As a consequence of the decision, states and municipalities are blocked from using a method of public financing that is simultaneously likely to attract candidates fearful they will be vastly outspent and sensitive to avoiding needless government expense. "The government can still use taxpayer funds to subsidize political campaigns, but it can only do that in a manner that provides an alternative to private financing" said William R. Maurer, a lawyer with Institute for Justice, which represented several challengers of the law. "It cannot create disincentives." The ruling meant the end of similar matching-fund programs in Connecticut, Maine and a few other places according to David Primo, a political science professor at University of Rochester who was an expert witness for the law's challengers.

State campaign-spending limits

Despite the Citizens United ruling, in December 2011, the Montana Supreme Court, in Western Tradition Partnership, Inc. v. Attorney General of Montana, upheld that state's law limiting corporate contributions. Examining the history of corporate interference in Montana government that led to the Corrupt Practices Law, the majority decided that the state still had a compelling reason to maintain the restrictions. It ruled that these restrictions on speech were narrowly tailored and withstood strict scrutiny and thus did not contradict Citizens United v. Federal Election Commission.

While granting permission to file a certiorari petition, the US Supreme Court agreed to stay the Montana ruling, although Justices Ginsburg and Breyer wrote a short statement urging the court "to consider whether, in light of the huge sums of money currently deployed to buy candidate's allegiance, Citizens United should continue to hold sway". In June 2012, over the dissent of the same four judges who dissented in Citizens United, the court simultaneously granted certiorari and summarily reversed the decision in American Tradition Partnership, Inc. v. Bullock, 567, U.S. __ (2012). The Supreme Court majority rejected the Montana Supreme Court arguments in a two paragraph, twenty line per curiam opinion, stating that these arguments "either were already rejected in Citizens United, or fail to meaningfully distinguish that case." The ruling makes clear that states cannot bar corporate and union political expenditures in state elections.

McCutcheon v. FEC

In addition to limiting the size of donations to individual candidates and parties, the Federal Election Campaign Act also includes aggregate caps on the total amount that an individual may give to all candidates and parties. In 2012, Shaun McCutcheon, a Republican Party activist, sought to donate more than was allowed by the federal aggregate limit on federal candidates. McCutcheon et al filed suit against the Federal Election Commission (FEC). In 2014, the US Supreme Court reversed a ruling of the DC District Court's dismissal of McCutcheon v. FEC and struck down the aggregate limits. The plurality opinion invalidated only the aggregate contribution limits, not limits on giving to any one candidate or party. The decisive fifth vote for McCutcheon came from Justice Thomas, who wrote a concurring opinion stating that all contribution limits are unconstitutional.

Legislative responses

Legislative impact
The New York Times reported that 24 states with laws prohibiting or limiting independent expenditures by unions and corporations would have to change their campaign finance laws because of the ruling.

After Citizens United and SpeechNow.org numerous state legislatures raised their limits on contributions to candidates and parties. At the federal level, lawmakers substantially increased contribution limits to political parties as part of the 2014 budget bill. Such changes are widely perceived as efforts to place candidates and parties on something closer to equal footing with organizations making independent expenditures.

While many states and the federal government have raised contribution limits in response to Citizens United, proposals aimed at discouraging political spending, or providing for public financing of campaigns, have been less successful.

Senator Dick Durbin (D-IL) proposed that candidates who sign up small donors receive $900,000 in public money, but the proposal has not been acted on by Congress. Others proposed that laws on corporate governance be amended to assure that shareholders vote on political expenditures.

In February 2010, Senator Charles E. Schumer of New York, immediate past Chairman of the Democratic Senatorial Campaign Committee, and Representative Chris Van Hollen of Maryland, Chairman of the Democratic Congressional Campaign Committee, outlined legislation aimed at undoing the decision.  In April 2010, they introduced such legislation in the Senate and House, respectively. On June 24, 2010, H.R.5175 (The DISCLOSE Act) passed in the House of Representatives but failed in the Senate. It would have required additional disclosure by corporations of their campaign expenditures.  The law, if passed, would also have prohibited political spending by U.S. companies with twenty percent or more foreign ownership, and by most government contractors. The DISCLOSE Act included exemptions to its rules given to certain special interests such as the National Rifle Association and the American Association of Retired Persons. These gaps within the proposal attracted criticism from lawmakers on both political parties. "They are auctioning off pieces of the First Amendment in this bill ... The bigger you are, the stronger you are, the less disclosure you have", said Republican Congressman Dan Lungren of California. Democratic Congressman Adam Schiff of California commented, "I wish there had been no carve-outs".
The bill was criticized as prohibiting much activity that was legal before Citizens United.

The DISCLOSE Act twice failed to pass the U.S. Senate in the 111th Congress, in both instances reaching only 59 of the 60 votes required to overcome a unified Republican filibuster. A scaled down version of the DISCLOSE Act was reintroduced in both the House and Senate in 2012 but did not pass.

Some have argued for a constitutional amendment to overturn the decision. Although the decision does not address "corporate personhood", a long-established judicial and constitutional concept, much attention has focused on that issue. Move to Amend, a coalition formed in response to the ruling, seeks to amend the Constitution to abolish corporate personhood, thus stripping corporations of all rights under the Constitution. In an online chat with web community Reddit, President Obama endorsed further consideration of a constitutional amendment and stated "Over the longer term, I think we need to seriously consider mobilizing a constitutional amendment process to overturn Citizens United (assuming the Supreme Court doesn't revisit it)". He further elaborated that "Even if the amendment process falls short, it can shine a spotlight on the super-PAC phenomenon and help apply pressure for change."

Legislative reactions by state and local lawmakers

Members of 16 state legislatures have called for a constitutional amendment to reverse the court's decision: California, Colorado, Connecticut, Delaware, Hawaii, Illinois, Maine, Maryland, Massachusetts, Montana, New Jersey, New Mexico, Oregon, Rhode Island, Vermont, and West Virginia.

Most of these are non-binding resolutions, but three states—Vermont, California, and Illinois—called for an Article V Convention to draft and propose a federal constitutional amendment to overturn Citizens United.  In Minnesota, the Minnesota Senate passed a similar resolution, "Senate File No. 17", on May 2, 2013, but the House of Representatives returned the measure to the General Calendar (meaning the measure did not pass) on May 15, 2013. Thirty-four states are needed to call an Article V convention.

On a local level, Washington D.C. and 400 other municipalities passed resolutions requesting a federal constitutional amendment.

Since Citizens United, however, 13 states have actually raised their contribution limits.

Political impact
Critics predicted that the ruling would "bring about a new era of corporate influence in politics", allowing companies and businesspeople to "buy elections" to promote their financial interests. Instead, large expenditures, usually through "Super PACS", have come from "a small group of billionaires", based largely on ideology. This has shifted power "away from the political parties and toward the ... donors themselves. In part, this explains the large number and variety of candidates fielded by the Republicans in 2016."

According to a 2021 study, the ruling weakened political parties while strengthening single-issue advocacy groups and Super PACs funded by billionaires with pet issues. The ruling made it easier for self-promoting politicians to undermine political processes and democratic norms to promote themselves.

Super PACs
Citizens United v. Federal Election Commission has often been credited for the creation of "super PACs", political action committees which make no financial contributions to candidates or parties, and so can accept unlimited contributions from individuals, corporations and unions. Certainly, the holding in Citizens United helped affirm the legal basis for super PACs by deciding that, for purposes of establishing a "compelling government interest" of corruption sufficient to justify government limitations on political speech, "independent expenditures, including those made by corporations, do not give rise to corruption or the appearance of corruption".

It took another decision, by the U.S. Court of Appeals for the District of Columbia Circuit, Speechnow.org v. Federal Election Commission, to actually authorize the creation of super PACs. While Citizens United held that corporations and unions could make independent expenditures, a separate provision of the Federal Election Campaign Act, at least as long interpreted by the Federal Election Commission, held that individuals could not contribute to a common fund without it becoming a PAC. PACs, in turn, were not allowed to accept corporate or union contributions of any size or to accept individual contributions in excess of $5,000. In Speechnow.org, the D.C. Circuit, sitting en banc, held 9–0 that in light of Citizens United, such restrictions on the sources and size of contributions could not apply to an organization that made only independent expenditures in support of or opposition to a candidate but not contributions to a candidate's campaign.

Citizens United and SpeechNOW left their imprint on the 2012 United States presidential election, in which single individuals contributed large sums to "super PACs" supporting particular candidates. Sheldon Adelson, the gambling entrepreneur, gave approximately fifteen million dollars to support Newt Gingrich. Foster Friess, a Wyoming financier, donated almost two million dollars to Rick Santorum's super PAC. Karl Rove organized super PACs that spent over $300 million in support of Republicans during the 2012 elections.

In addition to indirectly providing support for the creation of super PACs, Citizens United allowed incorporated 501(c)(4) public advocacy groups (such as the National Rifle Association, the Sierra Club, and the group Citizens United itself) and trade associations to make expenditures in political races. Such groups may not, under the tax code, have a primary purpose of engaging in electoral advocacy. These organizations must disclose their expenditures, but unlike super PACs they do not have to include the names of their donors in their FEC filings. A number of partisan organizations such as Karl Rove's influential conservative Crossroads Grassroots Policy Strategies and the liberal 21st Century Colorado have since registered as tax-exempt 501(c)(4) groups (defined as groups promoting "social welfare") and engaged in substantial political spending. This has led to claims of large secret donations, and questions about whether such groups should be required to disclose their donors. Historically, such non-profits have not been required to disclose their donors or names of members. See National Association for the Advancement of Colored People v. Alabama.

In an August 2015 essay in Der Spiegel, Markus Feldkirchen wrote that the Citizens United decision was "now becoming visible for the first time" in federal elections as the super-rich have "radically" increased donations to support their candidates and positions via super PACs. Feldkirchen also said in the first six months of 2015 the candidates and their super PACs received close to $400 million: "far more than in the entire previous campaign". He opined that super-rich donating more than ever before to individual campaigns plus the "enormous" chasm in wealth has given the super-rich the power to steer the economic and political direction of the United States and undermine its democracy. In October 2015, The New York Times observed that just 158 super-rich families each contributed $250,000 or more, while an additional 200 families gave more than $100,000 for the 2016 presidential election. Both groups contributed almost half of the "early money" for candidates in the 2016 presidential election as of June 30, 2015 through channels like super PACs legalized by the Supreme Court's Citizens United decision.

Weakening of "establishment" forces
At least in the Republican Party, the Citizens United ruling has weakened the fund raising power of the Republican "establishment" in the form of the "three major" Republican campaign committees (Republican National Committee, National Republican Congressional Committee, National Republican Senatorial Committee). Columnist Thomas B. Edsall notes that in 2008, "the last election before the Citizens United decision", the three campaign committees "raised six times" the money that "nonparty conservative organizations" did—$657.6 million vs. $111.9 million. By 2016 those party committees raised less than the independent groups—$652.4 million v. $810.4 million. Thus the new funding "freed candidates to defy" the party establishment, although not, it seems, to move policy making away from traditional Republican priorities.
From 2010 to 2018, super PACs spent approximately $2.9 billion on federal elections. Notably, the bulk of that money comes from just a few wealthy individual donors. In the 2018 election cycle, for example, the top 100 donors to super PACs contributed nearly 78 percent of all super PAC spending.

Republican advantage 
Studies have shown that the Citizens United ruling gave Republicans an advantage in subsequent elections. One study by political scientists at University of Chicago, Columbia University and the London School of Economics found "that Citizens United increased the GOP's average seat share in the state legislature by five percentage points. That is a large effect—large enough that, were it applied to the past twelve Congresses, partisan control of the House would have switched eight times. In line with a previous study, we also find that the vote share of Republican candidates increased three to four points, on average." A 2016 study in The Journal of Law and Economics found "that Citizens United is associated with an increase in Republicans' election probabilities in state house races of approximately 4 percentage points overall and 10 or more percentage points in several states. We link these estimates to on-the-ground evidence of significant spending by corporations through channels enabled by Citizens United." According to a 2020 study, the ruling boosted the electoral success of Republican candidates.

See also
 1996 United States campaign finance controversy
 2009 term opinions of the Supreme Court of the United States
 Bank of the United States v. Deveaux (1809)
 James Bopp
 David Bossie
 End Citizens United
 Issue advocacy ads
 US corporate law
 Bowman v United Kingdom [1998] ECHR 4, (1998) 26 EHRR 1, case under the European Convention on Human Rights allowing restrictions on spending money to promote political equality
 Harper v. Canada (Attorney General) [2004] SCR 827, restrictions on spending in Canada
 Animal Defenders International v United Kingdom [2013] ECHR 362, the leading case in Europe held that the UK's total ban on political advertising was compatible with freedom of expression "given the danger of unequal access based on wealth and to political advertising" which goes "to the heart of the democratic process."
 Electoral reform in the United States, which discusses efforts to overturn Citizens United among other electoral reform initiatives.
 McConnell v. FEC
 Buckley v. Valeo
 McCutcheon v. FEC
 FEC v. National Conservative PAC
 FEC v. Wisconsin Right to Life, Inc.
 FEC v. Massachusetts Citizens for Life

References

Further reading
 Alexander M. "Citizens United and equality forgotten" 35 New York University Review of Law & Social Change (2011) 499.
 Brown, W. "Law and Legal Reason", Undoing the Demos: Neoliberalism's Stealth Revolution (Zone Books, 2015): 151–173.
 Dawood, Yasmin. "Campaign Finance and American Democracy." Annual Review of Political Science (2015) Abstract & download
 Gerken H. "The real problem with Citizens United: Campaign finance, dark money, and shadow parties" 97 Marquette Law Review (2014) 903.
 Hansen, Wendy L., Michael S. Rocca, and Brittany Leigh Ortiz. "The effects of Citizens United on corporate spending in the 2012 presidential election." Journal of Politics 77.2 (2015): 535–545. in JSTOR
 Kang M. "The end of campaign finance law" 98 Virginia Law Review (2012)  1.
 Kuhner T. Capitalism v. Democracy: Money in Politics and the Free Market Constitution (Stanford University Press, 2014)
 Ewan McGaughey, 'Fascism-Lite in America (or the social idea of Donald Trump)' (2016) TLI Think! Paper 26/2016
 Post, Robert, ed. Citizens Divided: Campaign Finance Reform and the Constitution (Harvard University Press, 2014)

External links
 
 "Did the Citizens United Ruling Shut Out Your Voice?"
 Court documents. Dead link.
 Court documents
 Oral Argument Transcript, PDF links to one of the two oral arguments.
 Text of Supreme Court decision, PDF
 Text of Supreme Court decision, HTML
 Seligman, Joel, "Is The Corporation The Person? Reflections on Citizens United v. Federal Election Commission", speech May 6, 2010; with thanks by Seligman to John Field for assistance.
 Zephyr Teachout, The Anti-Corruption Principle, 94 Cornell L. Rev. 341 (2009).
 Citizens United and the Scope of Professor Teachout's Anti-Corruption Principle, 107 Nw. U. L. Rev. 399; 107 Nw. U. L. Rev. Colloquy 1 (2012).
 "Money Unlimited: How John Roberts Orchestrated Citizens United" by Jeffrey Toobin, published in The New Yorker on May 21, 2012. An article about the beginnings of campaign finance law i.e. the Tillman Act of 1907, the Supreme Court case history regarding campaign finance before Citizens United, the court proceedings leading to the Citizens United ruling, and the aftermath of Citizens United.

2010 in United States case law
Corporate personhood
Federal Election Commission litigation
Campaign finance in the United States
United States elections case law
United States Free Speech Clause case law
United States Supreme Court cases of the Roberts Court
United States Supreme Court cases
United States Supreme Court decisions that overrule a prior Supreme Court decision
Judicial activism